The Nordic Investment Bank (NIB) is an international financial institution founded in 1975 by the five Nordic countries (Denmark, Finland, Iceland, Norway, and Sweden). In 2005, the three Baltic states (Estonia, Latvia, and Lithuania) also became members of the Bank. NIB’s headquarters are located in Helsinki, Finland. NIB acquires the funds for its lending by borrowing on the international capital markets.

Strategy 
NIB offers loans and guarantees to customers in both the private and public sectors. The Bank's primary lending areas are:

 Public Sector & Utilities
 Infrastructure & Project Finance
 Industry
 Services & Consumer
 Financial Institutions

In addition, NIB offers sustainability-linked loans that provide financial incentives to help companies reach their sustainability objectives. The Bank acquires the funds for its lending by borrowing from international capital markets. NIB's bonds have achieved the highest possible credit rating, AAA/Aaa, from the renowned rating agencies Standard & Poor’s and Moody’s. This impressive rating is a testament to the Bank's commitment to providing reliable and sustainable financing solutions.

Structure and management 
Each member country designates a Governor to the Bank's Board of Governors, which is the supreme decision-making body. The Control Committee is the Bank's supervisory body. The Board of Directors makes policy decisions concerning the operations and approves the financial transactions proposed by NIB's President. 

Presidents: 
 Bert Lindström, Sweden,  1975 – 1986            
 Jannik Lindbæk, Norway, 1986 – 1994
 Jón Sigurðsson, Iceland, 1994 – 2005              
 Johnny Åkerholm, Finland, 2005 – 2012
 Henrik Normann, Denmark, 2012 – 2021       
 André Küüsvek, Estonia, 2021 – present

The Bank boasts a staff of approximately 230 employees, both from the member region and beyond. NIB's headquarters are located in Helsinki, Finland, and English is the official language of the Bank.

References

External links

NDPTL official website

Supranational banks
Multilateral development banks
International banking institutions
Nordic organizations
1970s establishments in Europe